Abhijit Salvi (born 5 October 1999) is an Indian cricketer. He made his List A debut for Services in the 2016–17 Vijay Hazare Trophy on 25 February 2017. He made his first-class debut on 25 December 2019, for Services in the 2019–20 Ranji Trophy.

References

External links
 

1992 births
Living people
Indian cricketers
Services cricketers
Place of birth missing (living people)